'Woodhill is a rural locality in the City of Logan, Queensland, Australia. In the  Woodhill had a population of 723 people.

History
Townsvale National School opened on 2 June 1873. On 1 January 1874 it was became Veresdale State School. In 1899 it was renamed Woodhill State School.

Woodhill railway station was on the disused Beaudesert railway line from Bethania to Beaudesert. The line opened on 16 May 1888.

Formerly in the Shire of Beaudesert, Woodhill became part of Logan City following the local government amalgamations in March 2008.

In the  Woodhill had a population of 723 people.

Geography
The Logan River forms the western boundary.

Road infrastructure
The Mount Lindesay Highway runs through from north to south.

Education 
Woodhill State School is a government primary (Prep-6) school for boys and girls at 6027 Mount Lindesay Highway. In 2018, the school had an enrolment of 211 students with 16 teachers (14 full-time equivalent) and 13 non-teaching staff (8 full-time equivalent).

References

Suburbs of Logan City
Localities in Queensland